A polycystic disease is a disease that involves multiple cysts scattered throughout an organ, including:

Polycystic kidney disease
Polycystic liver disease
Polycystic ovary syndrome